Rise of Empires: Ottoman is a Turkish historical docudrama, starring Cem Yiğit Üzümoğlu, Tommaso Basili and Daniel Nuță. Its first season, which consists of 6 episodes, is directed by Emre Sahin and written by Kelly McPherson. It became available for streaming on Netflix on 24 January 2020. It deals with the Ottoman Empire and Mehmed the Conqueror and tells the story of the Fall of Constantinople. The second season also has 6 episodes and premiered on 29 December 2022, focusing on the 1462 campaign against Vlad the Impaler in Wallachia (in present-day Romania).

Premise 
In Season 1, Sultan Mehmed the Conqueror wages a campaign to take the Eastern Roman capital of Constantinople in 1453, resulting in the capture of the city and establishment of the Ottoman Empire.

In Season 2, Mehmed the Conqueror and Vlad the Impaler, childhood companions in the Ottoman court, go head-to-head in the 1462 Ottoman invasion of Wallachia.

Cast 
 Cem Yiğit Üzümoğlu as Mehmed the Conqueror
 Tommaso Basili as Constantine XI Palaiologos
 Daniel Nuță as Vlad the Impaler (season 2)
 Radu-Andrei Micu as Dimitrie (season 2)
 Ali Gözüşirin as Radu the Handsome (season 2)
 Tuba Büyüküstün as Mara Branković
 Damla Sönmez as Ana
 Osman Sonant as Loukas Notaras
 Tolga Tekin as Murad II
 Ushan Çakır as Zaganos Pasha
 Selim Bayraktar as Çandarlı Halil Pasha
 Birkan Sokullu as Giovanni Giustiniani
 Tansu Biçer as Orban
 Nail Kırmızıgül as Hızır Çelebi
 Eva Dedova as Katarina
 Tuğrul Tülek as George Sphrantzes
 İlayda Akdoğan as Therma Sphrantzes
 Erdal Yıldız as Suleiman Baltoghlu
 Baki Davrak as Đurađ Branković
 Ryan OL as Genovese Nobleman
 Roger Crowley, historian
 Lars Brownworth, historian
 Jason Goodwin, historian
 Marios Philippides, historian
 Michael Talbot, historian
 Emrah Safa Gürkan, historian
 Andrei Pogăciaș, historian (season 2)
 Mihai-Florin Hasan, historian (season 2)
 Celâl Şengör, geologist
 James Waterson, author Dracula's Wars

Episodes

Series overview

Season 1 (2020)

Season 2 (2022)

Critical response 
Generally, the reception is positive. Rise of Empires: Ottoman delivers, with a similarly novel approach, a chronicle of historical events.  Daily History concludes that "the series uses correct timeline and description of the attack on Constantinople is incredibly accurate from the Ottoman perspective." At the same time, the series was criticized for some inaccuracies.

See also 
 Night Attack at Târgoviște

References

External links

How Historically Accurate is the Rise of Empires: Ottoman Series? at DailyHistory.org

2020 Turkish television series debuts
2020 Turkish television series endings
2020s Turkish television series
Television series set in the 15th century
English-language Netflix original programming
Television series about the Ottoman Empire
Turkish-language Netflix original programming
Turkish drama television series
Television series produced in Istanbul
Television shows set in Istanbul
Cultural depictions of Mehmed the Conqueror
Fall of Constantinople 
Documentary films about Romania
Cultural depictions of Vlad the Impaler